The Santa Fe Railway Monzanola Depot, also known as Manzanola station, was an Atchison, Topeka and Santa Fe Railway in Manzanola, Colorado. Now used as a town hall, the property has been on the National Register of Historic Places since April 28, 2004.

History
The single track railroad line to Pueblo, Colorado was completed by the Santa Fe Railway in 1876. Although the track existed, the depot wasn't built until 1913. The station first opened with both freight and passenger services. The depot was finally closed by the railroad in 1973. The station remained vacant until, in 1976, it was donated to the city of Manzanola. In 1991, a senior center opened in the former waiting room area.

Restoration
Most of the building has been in a steady decline since the donation to the town in 1976. Until 2007, the only part of the station in use was the east side, with a small senior center. With the grand opening in November 2007, the new depot houses the town hall and police department. The construction was done by White Construction Group.

References

External links
Manzanola Santa Fe Depot / Town Hall
Picture
Picture from Flickr

Manzanola
Former railway stations in Colorado
Railway stations on the National Register of Historic Places in Colorado
Transportation buildings and structures in Otero County, Colorado
Railway stations in the United States opened in 1913
1913 establishments in Colorado
National Register of Historic Places in Otero County, Colorado
Railway stations closed in 1973